Carl James Heneghan (born January 1968) is a British general practitioner physician, a clinical epidemiologist and a Fellow of Kellogg College. He is the director of the University of Oxford's Centre for Evidence-Based Medicine and former Editor-in-Chief of BMJ Evidence-Based Medicine. 

Heneghan is one of the founders of AllTrials, an international initiative which calls for all studies to be published, and their results reported. In 2013 he was voted on to the Health Service Journal's list of top 100 most influential clinical leaders in England. He is a member of the Scientific Advisory Board of Collateral Global, an organisation that examines the global impact of the COVID-19 restrictions.

COVID-19 commentary 
On 21 September 2020, Heneghan alongside Sunetra Gupta, Karol Sikora and 28 signatories wrote an open letter to the UK prime minister, chancellor and chief medical officers asking for a rethink of the government's COVID-19 strategy. They argued in favour of a targeted approach to lockdowns advising that only over-65s and the vulnerable should be shielded.

During the pandemic, Heneghan has written for The Spectator magazine. In it, he has commentated on various aspects of the UK's governments response to the COVID-19 pandemic. On 19 November 2020, he wrote an article with Tom Jefferson, an epidemiologist, in which he criticised the science behind wearing face masks to reduce transmissions of COVID-19. In the article he stated that; "Now we have properly rigorous scientific research that we can rely on, the evidence shows that wearing masks in the community does not significantly reduce the rates of infection." His claim was met with criticism. Sonia Sodha of The Guardian argued that Heneghan had made scientific errors because he had misrepresented a Danish randomized controlled trial which studied infection transmission rates on people who wore face masks. This was because the Danish mask study was only focused on infection transmissions for those wearing masks, rather than on the overall community, so could not be used to make judgements on the effects of face masks on community wide transmission rates. 

Kamran Abbasi, executive editor of the British Medical Journal (BMJ), also criticised Heneghan's claims about face masks because he believed his interpretation of the Danish study was inaccurate. However, Abbasi stressed that he believed it was wrong that Heneghan's opinion be marked as “false information" on Facebook because, as he wrote in the BMJ, "disagreement among experts, especially about interpretation of a study, is a common occurrence. It is the usual business of science."

In March 2021, Heneghan published a paper denying the role of airborne transmission in spreading COVID-19.

Publications 

 Evidence-Based Medicine Toolkit - EBMT-EBM Toolkit Series, Carl Heneghan, Douglas Badenoch. BMJ Publishing Group, 2006. 
 Statistics Toolkit - EBMT-EBM Toolkit Series, Rafael Perera, Carl Heneghan, Douglas Badenoch. John Wiley and Sons Ltd, 2011.

References

External links 
Carl Heneghan

21st-century British medical doctors
Living people
1968 births